You Are My Love is a studio album by Frankie Laine released in 1959 on Columbia Records.

Track listing

References 

1959 albums
Frankie Laine albums
Columbia Records albums